is a Japanese cuisine chef most notable as the first Japanese Iron Chef on the television series Iron Chef.  He was on the show from its inception in 1993 until his retirement on his 65th birthday, January 3, 1996.  After his retirement as an Iron Chef, he made sporadic appearances on the show, and producers even dedicated a special 1996 tribute episode to him called The Legend of Michiba.

Career as Iron Chef

Michiba was once considered a maverick for his philosophy of "there are no borders to ingredients."  Although primarily a Japanese chef, Michiba was unafraid of incorporating decidedly non-Japanese elements into his dishes — something that did not sit well with more traditional-minded Japanese cuisine chefs.  Indeed, in his first battle against French cuisine-trained Kobayakawa Yousei, Michiba was given a theme ingredient virtually foreign to Japanese cuisine: foie gras.  Michiba was declared the winner.

Michiba's trademark was "Inochi no Dashi" (命の出汁; いのちのだし or "Broth of Vigour",) a combination of katsuobushi, skipjack tuna shavings and edible kelp (konbu), which he used during virtually every battle. 

Despite being the oldest of the Iron Chefs, he holds the Kitchen Stadium record for most dishes in a battle: eight.

Calligraphy
Michiba was also skilled in calligraphy, often using precious minutes, usually at the beginning of a battle, to write a menu.  On one occasion, however, Michiba forgot to write a menu and lost a battle; on another occasion, he did it at the last moment and lost as well.  In an episode where his sous-chef challenged Iron Chef Masaharu Morimoto, Michiba explained that he wrote out his menu partly to clarify what he wanted to present, and partly to inform his assistants so that they would know which ingredients to gather and prepare.  Several challengers also wrote out their menus during their battle; commentators referred to this as "taking a page out of Iron Chef Michiba's book."

Retirement

Michiba's tenure was interrupted by an illness in mid-1995 that briefly hospitalized him, and afterwards, although his cooking form was as good as ever, he began tiring from the stress of appearing on the show and running his three restaurants: Poisson Rokusaburo in Akasaka, and Ginza Rokusan-tei and Kaishoku-Michiba in Ginza.  It only worsened during overtime battles which were made possible by the addition of a fourth judge.

According to Takeshi Kaga, after his decision to retire, Rokusaburo Michiba vowed to personally recruit his successor.  The show continued with just Iron Chef French Hiroyuki Sakai and Iron Chef Chinese Chen Kenichi for two months.  But, finally, it was announced that Michiba had completed his mission with the naming of Koumei Nakamura.  "All my instincts told me he was the one," said Michiba.  Initially, Nakamura refused but was convinced to accept.  Nakamura's first battle on March 1, 1996 against French chef Kiyoshi Suzuki.  During the introduction of the theme ingredient of the day, Chairman Kaga stated that he could not resist choosing foie gras because he wanted to relive some of the magic of Michiba's first victory using the same ingredient.

Michiba was also extremely supportive of Nakamura's successor, Masaharu Morimoto.  Inarguably, Morimoto took Michiba's "no borders to ingredients" philosophy to a different level. The show often referred to the relationship between Michiba and Morimoto as that between master and student, especially after an episode where Michiba flew to New York to visit Morimoto's restaurant, Nobu. So supportive of Morimoto was Michiba that, before his infamous New York battle with chef Bobby Flay, Michiba gave Morimoto a large box of katsuobushi flakes with a hand-calligraphed message: "respect the old, but seek out the new."

Subsequent appearances
Michiba made appearances throughout the 2012 revival of Iron Chef through interviews with former assistant Kenichi Miyanaga, a seat on the tasting panel, and as a competitor against new Iron Chef Jun Kurogi in the revival's 2012 "Ryouri no Tetsujin Dream Match! World Iron Chef Live Battle Special."

Manga
The manga series Kandō Ō Retsuden featured a story about Michiba in volume 2, called Michiba Rokusaburō Monogatari. The data collecting and organizing was made by Yasuo Negishi and it was illustrated by Yoshihiro Takahashi.

External links
 official site 
 Ginza Rokusantei

References 

1931 births
Living people
People from Ishikawa Prefecture
Japanese chefs